Haggerston, formally known as the "Haggerston Division of Shoreditch", was a borough constituency centred on the Haggerston district of the Metropolitan Borough of Shoreditch in London.  It returned one Member of Parliament (MP) to the House of Commons of the Parliament of the United Kingdom, elected by the first past the post system.

History 

The constituency was created by the Redistribution of Seats Act 1885 for the 1885 general election and abolished for the 1918 general election.

Boundaries

The constituency was created in 1885, as a division of the parliamentary borough of Shoreditch in the East End of London. The area was administered as part of the Tower division of the county of Middlesex.

The division consisted of the Acron, Haggerston, Kingsland and Whitmore wards.

In 1889 there were administrative changes. The territory of the constituency was severed from Middlesex and included in the new County of London. The lower tier of local government in the area continued to be administered by parish vestries and local boards of works.

In 1900 local government in London was rationalised. The civil parish of St. Leonard, Shoreditch became part of a larger Metropolitan Borough of Shoreditch.

In the redistribution of parliamentary seats in 1918, the Metropolitan Borough of Shoreditch constituted a single parliamentary division of Shoreditch. The Haggerston division was abolished.

Members of Parliament

Election results

Elections in the 1880s

Elections in the 1890s

Elections in the 1900s

Elections in the 1910s

References

Parliamentary constituencies in London (historic)
Constituencies of the Parliament of the United Kingdom established in 1885
Constituencies of the Parliament of the United Kingdom disestablished in 1918